Attala may refer to:

 Saint Attala (6th century CE - 627)
 Attala County, Mississippi, USA
 USS Attala (APA-130), ship
 Attala, Hungary, village

See also
 Atala (disambiguation)
 Atalla (disambiguation)
 Attalla, Alabama, USA
 Attla (disambiguation)